David John Llewellyn (born 18 November 1951) is a Welsh professional golfer.

Llewellyn played on the European Tour in the 1970s after being named the Sir Henry Cotton Rookie of the Year in 1971. He achieved a personal best ranking of 39th on the Order or Merit in 1974, but did not win any tournaments in this period. After a spell as a club professional at Craythorne Golf Centre (1975–78), Royal Malta Golf Club (1978–81) and Thirsk and Northallerton Golf Club (1982–84), he returned to tournament golf in 1984, and collected several tournament victories during the following years. His sole win on the main European Tour was the 1988 AGF Biarritz Open, when he set a tour record four round total of 258. The scoring record was tied by Llewellyn's countryman Ian Woosnam in 1990 and not beaten until more than 32 years later, when Andy Sullivan scored 257 at the 2020 English Championship.

Llewellyn also won the 1987 Vernon's tournament in Merseyside, on the informal European satellite tour which existed before the official Challenge Tour was founded, and the 1991 Ivory Coast Open, which was a Challenge Tour event. However the highlight of his career was perhaps winning the World Cup of Golf for Wales alongside Ian Woosnam in 1987.

Llewellyn left the tour for a second time in the early 1990s to return to being a club professional. He later became National Coach to the Golf Union of Wales between 2002 and 2007.

Professional wins (13)

European Tour wins (1)

European Tour playoff record (0–1)

Challenge Tour wins (2)

Safari Circuit wins (2)

Other wins (8)
1969 Warwickshire Assistants Championship, Warwickshire Assistants Matchplay
1970 Midland Professional Championship
1972 Kenya Open
1985 Welsh Professional Championship
1987 Vernons Open, World Cup (with Ian Woosnam)
1994 Cheshire and North Wales Open

Results in major championships

Note: Llewellyn only played in The Open Championship.

CUT = missed the half-way cut
"T" = tied

Team appearances
World Cup (representing Wales): 1974, 1985, 1987 (winners), 1988
Double Diamond International (representing Wales): 1971, 1972, 1974, 1975, 1976, 1977
Philip Morris International (representing Wales): 1975
Hennessy Cognac Cup (representing Wales): 1984
Alfred Dunhill Cup (representing Wales): 1985, 1988, 1989
PGA Cup (representing Great Britain and Ireland): 2000 (non-playing captain)

References

External links

Welsh male golfers
European Tour golfers
Sportspeople from Dover, Kent
1951 births
Living people